Dejan Đenić (: also transliterated Dejan Djenić; born 2 June 1986) is a Serbian professional footballer who plays for Kolubara in the Serbian SuperLiga.

Career
Dejan Đenić started his career in his hometown club FK Remont Čačak in the 4th league. In his first season, he accomplished promotion with the club to the 2005-06 Serbian League West, 3rd League. In the winter break of that season he moved to Slovenia but he only played one match for the club in the Slovenian First League. In summer 2007, still young, he went to the Netherlands and played six months with the B squad of SC Heerenveen before returning in winter to Serbia to play the rest of the season with FK Novi Pazar in the Serbian First League, second national division. While playing there he became a standard player having for the first time the chance of playing 16 league matches in half season. This did not go unnoticed, and an ambitious club from Azerbaijan, Standard Baku signed him that summer, in 2007. However next winter he went back to Serbia and helped the Vlade Divac backed club FK Sloga Kraljevo to be promoted to the Serbian First League. Next summer he moved, this time to Montenegrin First League club FK Jedinstvo Bijelo Polje. But this was only for a half season spell, since he moved next winter to Poland to play with Ekstraklasa historical club ŁKS Łódź. That year was not successful for the club and at the end of the season they were relegated. Đenić however stayed this time, but after six months playing in Polish second level he returned to Serbia and signed with FK Bežanija who were playing in the Serbian second level. This proved to be good for him since he managed to score 6 times in 11 league matches attracting the attention of the Serbian SuperLiga clubs. The most persistent was FK Jagodina and they signed him in summer 2010.

Honours
Jagodina
Serbian Cup: 2013

References

External links
 
 
 
 
 Dejan Đenić at Utakmica.rs 

1986 births
Living people
Sportspeople from Čačak
Serbian footballers
Association football forwards
FK Novi Pazar players
FK Sloga Kraljevo players
FK Bežanija players
FK Jagodina players
FK Borac Čačak players
FK Rad players
FK Metalac Gornji Milanovac players
Serbian First League players
Serbian SuperLiga players
NK Drava Ptuj players
Expatriate footballers in Slovenia
Expatriate footballers in the Netherlands
FK Standard Sumgayit players
Expatriate footballers in Azerbaijan
FK Jedinstvo Bijelo Polje players
ŁKS Łódź players
Ekstraklasa players
Expatriate footballers in Poland
Serbian expatriate footballers
Serbian expatriate sportspeople in the Netherlands
Serbian expatriate sportspeople in Slovenia
Serbian expatriate sportspeople in Azerbaijan
Serbian expatriate sportspeople in Poland
SC Heerenveen players
FK Kolubara players